Robert Giles is a journalist.

Robert or Bob Giles may also refer to:

Robert Giles (civil servant)
Robert Giles (MP), son of John Giles (MP fl. 1417–1435)
Bob Giles, Australian rules footballer